Felix Project is a United Kingdom charitable organization that saves surplus food from suppliers and redistributes it to charities. It has the dual aim to help reduce food surplus. The Waste & Resources Action Programme (abbr. WRAP) estimate that 10 million tonnes of food was thrown away in the UK in 2016 and help relieve food poverty (Sustain estimate 18% or one in five London pupils are at risk of hunger every day.

Work
The Felix Project redistributes food that supermarkets, wholesalers and other suppliers cannot sell for a variety of reasons, ranging from seasonal gluts and packaging defects, to changes in customer orders. It sorts and delivers food, free of charge, direct to local kitchens, community halls, schools, day centres and food banks. The charities provide meals, snacks or food parcels for their clients who include the elderly, the homeless, those with mental health issues, refugees and asylum seekers, families and children.

Ten staff and nearly 200 volunteers provide food for over 1 million meals a year, working with 90 suppliers and 120 charities. A fleet of 10 vans operate from depots in Park Royal (West London), Central London and Enfield (North London).

As well as redistributing food Felix's Kitchen in Bow, East London, uses donated fresh produce to create circa 1,300 "ready meals" a day. Supervised by professional chefs the kitchen produces an ever changing menu of five or six different packaged meals daily, including vegetarian and vegan options.

History
The Felix Project was founded in July 2016, in memory of Felix Byam Shaw who died suddenly from meningitis. It started with a van and a depot in West London. A new depot in North London opened in November 2017. In 2018, weekly food deliveries to primary schools started with Stanhope Primary School, and a green scheme for cyclists and walkers to collect and deliver food in a courier bag.

Campaigns
The London Evening Standard and The Independent's 2017 Christmas Appeal raised £1,049,896 for the Felix Project's Help a Hungry Child Programme to establish 'market stalls' in primary schools, to help channel surplus food from suppliers directly to those young children and their families who are in the greatest need. The aim is to ensure no child in any primary school supported by the charity goes hungry.

56 Team Felix runners took part in The Big Half, London’s new half-marathon.

Collaboration with top London chefs aims to raise the profile of high-quality gastronomy and show the value of surplus food to encourage social inclusion. This includes partnering with Refettorio Felix at St Cuthbert’s Centre, a community kitchen founded by chef Massimo Bottura, and being the official charity partner for London Food Month which was attended by more than 100,000 people.

Funding
The Felix Project is funded by donations from individuals, corporate supporters and the Felix Byam Shaw Foundation. The Evening Standard’s Food for London campaign had The Felix Project as its flagship charity. Corporate sponsors donate vans, fridges and contribute to running costs.

Crowdfunding helped raise funds for a new depot in North London.

Department for Environment, Food & Rural Affairs awarded funding in the first round of their Food Waste Fund, which was awarded to redistribution organisations to substantially reduce food waste from businesses.

Awards

2017 Beacon Award for Philanthropy, for Justin Byam Shaw, founder of The Felix Project

See also

 Hunger in the United Kingdom

References

External links
  The Felix Project
  The Felix Project, registered charity no. 1168183
 The Felix Byam Shaw Foundation

Charities based in England
Charities based in London
Food waste in the United Kingdom